Kumoricon is an annual three-day anime convention held during October or November at the Oregon Convention Center in Portland, Oregon. The name of the convention comes from the Japanese word Kumori (曇り), meaning cloudy. Kumoricon is run by a volunteer staff and was previously held in Vancouver, Washington at the Hilton Vancouver Washington/Red Lion Vancouver at the Quay.

Programming
The convention typically offers board gaming, cosplay chess, cosplay competitions, dances (formal masquerade ball and informal), karaoke, music, music video contests, panels, tabletop gaming, video game tournaments, and workshops.

History
The convention originated from the anime club at the University of Oregon. Due to the convention's growth, in 2011 it was held in both the Hilton Vancouver Washington and the Red Lion Vancouver at the Quay. Kumoricon expanded to four days in 2014. Due to growth and lack of space, Kumoricon in 2016 moved to the Oregon Convention Center in Portland, Oregon. Demolition of Red Lion's Centennial Center and Kumoricon using six hotels also influenced the decision. Kumoricon used half the convention center in 2019. Kumoricon 2020 was cancelled due to the COVID-19 pandemic, and they announced an online convention in its place.

Event history

References

External links
Kumoricon Website

Anime conventions in the United States
Festivals established in 2003
2003 establishments in Oregon
Tourist attractions in Multnomah County, Oregon
Annual events in Portland, Oregon
Festivals in Portland, Oregon
Tourist attractions in Portland, Oregon
Conventions in Oregon